Ilaisia Tuiaki (born December 6, 1978) is an American football coach who was most recently the defensive coordinator at Brigham Young University (BYU). During his college playing career, Tuiaki was a linebacker and fullback at Southern Utah University (SUU) and Snow College. Tuiaki is a member of the Church of Jesus Christ of Latter-day Saints and earlier in his life served as an LDS missionary to New York City. In December 2015, Tuiaki was hired by Kalani Sitake to follow him to BYU as the defensive coordinator after serving as a coach at the University of Utah and Oregon State University with Sitake. Following the 2022 season, Tuiaki resigned his position as the defensive coordinator at BYU.

Education
Tuiaki has a bachelor's degree in English and physical education from SUU (2006).

References

External links
 BYU profile
 Utah State profile
 Southern Utah profile

1978 births
Living people
American football fullbacks
American football linebackers
BYU Cougars football coaches
Oregon State Beavers football coaches
Snow Badgers football players
Southern Utah Thunderbirds football players
Utah State Aggies football coaches
Utah Utes football coaches
High school football coaches in Utah
People from Oahu
American Latter Day Saints
American Mormon missionaries in the United States